The aXe - Spectral Extraction and Visualization software is designed to process large format astronomical slitless spectroscopic images such as those obtained with the Advanced Camera for Surveys (ACS) on the Hubble Space Telescope (HST). aXe is distributed as a subpackage for IRAF (Image Reduction and Analysis Facility - a general purpose software system for the reduction and analysis of astronomical data). The various aXe task can be executed within PyRAF, a command language that runs IRAF tasks and is based on the Python programming language.

The aXe package consists of several tasks, each of which performs a specific reduction step on the data to produce the final, extracted spectra. aXe is semiautomatic reduction system. After preparing all necessary input, the spectral reduction is done automatically. The user can then analyse and control the spectra and, if necessary, re-run aXe with slightly changed parameters until a satisfactory result is achieved.

A deep ACS WFC grism image can contain detectable spectra of several thousands objects. Checking each individual spectrum is very tedious. To help users analyzing the full wealth of their data, the additional aXe task aXe2web was developed. This tool produces browsable web pages from reduced spectral data to enable many hundreds of spectra to be examined quickly and discerningly. This tool can be used for a quick look or as preview facilities in data pipelines, databases or even for virtual observatories.

External links
 ST-ECF page for aXe

Astronomy software